Pierre Barbizet (20 September 1922 – 19 January 1990) was a 20th-century French pianist.

Barbizet was born in Arica, Chile, and died in Marseille.

1922 births
1990 deaths
20th-century French male classical pianists
Chevaliers of the Légion d'honneur
Officers of the Ordre national du Mérite
Officiers of the Ordre des Arts et des Lettres
Chilean emigrants to France